Praful Nandshankar Dave (5 March 1931 – 26 September 2009) was a Gujarati writer. He wrote under the pen name of Eva Dave.

Life 
Praful Nandshankar Dave was born on 5 March 1931 in Baroda, Gujarat, India (now Vadodara). His family was from Nadiad.  He completed his primary and secondary education in Nadiad and began attending university in 1949. He completed B. A. in Gujarati in 1953 and M. A. in 1955. He completed B. Ed. from Maharaja Sayajirao University of Baroda in 1956. He studied M. A. in Education in 1957 and Ph. D. in 1963 from Washington University in St. Louis.
He taught at a school in Vallabh Vidyanagar from 1952 to 1956. He also served as a principal in the school of Alina in 1955. He worked as a research assistant in Washington University from 1960 to 1962. He served as a research associate in Saint Louis Mental Hospital, United States in 1963. He returned to India in 1964. He served as the Reader from 1964 to 1972 and as the Professor from 1972 to 1974 in Mysore Regional College of Education, India. He served as a principal-in-charge of Ajmer Regional College of Education from 1977 to 1944(?). In 1977, he joined NCERT, New Delhi as the Reader and later served as the Professor until his retirement in 1991. He died on 26 September 2009.

Works
Novellas are the chief contribution of Dave. His first novella Sabuni Kakadi was published in Prajabandhu daily. He was a modernist story writer. His stories explore relationships, family life and the life in the west. His collections of stories are Agantuk (1969), Tarangininu Swapna (1971), Tahomatdar (1980), Kalrakshas (1999) and Chhellu Farman (2005). Agantuk had 25 stories while Tarangininu Swapna had 18 stories with fresh subjects.

Isune Charane: Preyasi (1970) contains two romantic short novels. Mishra Lohi (1999) is his other novel.

Awards
Dave was awarded prizes by the Gujarati Sahitya Parishad and the Gujarat Sahitya Akademi for his short stories. He received Govardhanram Tripathi Prize and 14th Doomketu Navlika Puraskar.

References 

1931 births
2009 deaths
Indian male novelists
Gujarati-language writers
20th-century Indian novelists
People from Vadodara
20th-century Indian short story writers
Maharaja Sayajirao University of Baroda alumni
Washington University in St. Louis alumni
Novelists from Gujarat